The Saving Gateway Accounts Act 2009 (c. 8) is an Act of the Parliament of the United Kingdom. It made provision for saving gateway accounts.

The Act was originally planned to commence in July 2010, and was aimed at encouraging the poorest to save.

Following the 2010 General Election, the new Coalition government scrapped the planned introduction, with Chancellor George Osborne saying that the scheme "not affordable". The Act was repealed by the Savings Accounts and Health in Pregnancy Grant Act 2010 on 16 February 2011.

References
Halsbury's Statutes,

External links
 Explanatory notes to the Saving Gateway Accounts Act 2009, from the National Archives.

United Kingdom Acts of Parliament 2009